The Brooklyn Bank Building is a historic bank structure located in Cleveland, Ohio, in the United States. Designed in 1904 prominent Cleveland architect J. Milton Dyer as a home for the Brooklyn Savings and Loan Association, the building exhibits a mix of architectural styles, including Neoclassical and Commercial, typical of Dyer's eclectic work.

The structure was added to the National Register of Historic Places (NRHP) on July 19, 1984. It was listed as a contributing property to the Archwood Avenue Historic District, which was added to the NRHP on March 19, 1987. It was listed as a contributing property to the Brooklyn Centre Historic District, which was added to the NRHP on March 4, 1999.

About the building
The Brooklyn Savings and Loan Association was incorporated on May 25, 1888, in Brooklyn Village (now Brooklyn Centre) near Cleveland, Ohio.

In early 1904, the bank commissioned local architect Charles E. Tousley to design a $40,000 ($ in  dollars) mixed-use structure to be the bank's new headquarters. By April, Tousley had delivered plans for a four-story structure consisting of ground floor retail space and apartments on the upper three floors. Tousley's structure was priced at $50,000 ($ in  dollars), and the bank declined to implement his plans and refused to pay him for his work. Tousley sued, and won his case in the Court of Common Pleas. The ruling was overturned by the 8th Ohio District Court of Appeals, and the appellate court's ruling affirmed by the Supreme Court of Ohio (Brooklyn Savings & Loan Ass'n Co. v. Tousley, 35 Ohio Cir. Ct. R. 613; aff'd Tousley v. Brooklyn Savings & Loan Ass'n, 89 N.E. 1126, 80 Ohio St. 737).

The bank then turned to noted local architect J. Milton Dyer. In August 1904, Dyer finished plans for a two-story mixed-use structure. These met the construction cap, and contracts were let. Contractors working on the building included F. & D. Lindhorst (masonry and terra cotta); J. Callaghan & Son (roof and sheet metal work); Pittsburgh Plate Glass (glass); Roebling Construction Co. (fireproofing); T.H. Brooks & Co. (iron and steel work); W.A. Eckerman Plumbing, Heating & Supply Co. (plumbing and steam heating); and the William Dunbar & Co. (carpentry). Construction was well under way by October, and it was completed by the end of the year. The bank occupied most of the ground floor, with additional space in the building filled by doctor's offices, lawyers, and realtors.

In 1901, Dyer embarked on a remarkably creative and prolific, 11-year period of architectural design that in time gave him a national reputation. He became so well known that Architectural Record devoted an entire article in November 1906 to his work.

The Brooklyn Savings and Loan building uses a diverse set of architectural styles. The structure is symmetrical and its elements tend to be regular and repetitive, which are elements of the Neoclassical style. There are deep segmental arches over the second-story windows are Late Victorian, however. The entablature seemingly supported by the piers as well as the brackets supporting the cornice are deliberately crude in order to give the building an individualized appearance. The structure is important to understanding the body of work Dyer created during his most prolific and creative period.

The Brooklyn Savings and Loan building was added to the National Register of Historic Places on July 19, 1984.

References

Bibliography

Downtown Cleveland
National Register of Historic Places in Cleveland, Ohio
Buildings and structures in Cleveland
Commercial buildings on the National Register of Historic Places in Ohio
Commercial buildings completed in 1904
Neoclassical architecture in Ohio
Victorian architecture in Ohio
Chicago school architecture in Ohio
1904 establishments in Ohio